Naing Lin Oo (born 15 January 1986) is a footballer from Burma, and a midfielder for Myanmar national football team. He played for Myanmar U-22 in 2013 AFC U-22 Asian Cup qualification
He currently plays for Ayeyawady United in Myanmar National League.

Honours

Club

Ayeyawady United
MFF Cup (2):  2012, 2014
2015 General Aung San Shield:

References

1986 births
Living people
Burmese footballers
Myanmar international footballers
Ayeyawady United F.C. players
Association football midfielders